Siberia is an unincorporated community in Clark Township, Perry County, in the U.S. state of Indiana.

History
Siberia was platted in 1869. According to legend, the town was originally going to be named Sabaria, after the place where Saint Martin of Tours was born. However, a Post Office Department employee designated the new community as Siberia, thinking "Sabaria" was a misspelling and the platter was referring to Siberia, a region of Russia, and the name stuck.

A post office was established at Siberia in 1883, and remained in operation until it was discontinued in 1983.

Geography

References

Unincorporated communities in Perry County, Indiana
Unincorporated communities in Indiana